New Hope, Arkansas may refer to several places:

New Hope, Pope County, Arkansas, an unincorporated community in Pope County
Newhope, Arkansas, an unincorporated community in Pike County

See also 
New Hope (disambiguation)